Yixing Shanjuan Cave is located at the south-west of Yixing, 25 kilometres away in Luoyan Mountain. It is the earliest cave tourist attractions in China managed by Yangxian Scenic Spot Tourism Development Company.

Introduction
Shanjuan Cave, Hanren Cave in Belgium and Lyon Cave in France are equally called as three greatest caves in the world. Shanjuan Cave is also a famous patriotic education base and well-known tourist attractions in our country. Up to now, it still keeps its reputation as 'Holy trace forever'() and some other beautiful names. Early in 1956, it was listed as the first kind of units of cultural relics protection. In 1982, it was named national important scenic spot. In 2001, it was evaluated as national four-A scenic spot and the education base of minors in Jiangsu Province. On May in 2006, it was awarded as 'Viliage of Liang Shanbo and Zhu Yingtai in China' by China folk artist association.

Constitution

Upper cave
Another name for the Upper Cave is Cloud Cave. Many spots are set in Upper Cave, such as the reflection of lotus, two plum blossom and house of pandas etc. The most amazing place in Upper Cave is the entrance. There, a huge rock blocking the convecting air in cave leads to the difference of temperature between up cave and middle cave. Therefore, the temperature in up cave keeps around 23 °C all year. In addition, for the temperature and water vapor, up cave is surrounded by clouds like a heaven.

Middle cave
Connected to up cave with a spiral stairs, the middle cave takes on a more beautiful appearance. Seven meters Zhong Ru Stone bamboo shoots stands upright the cave, called Di Zhu peak. By the nature of water droplets for hundreds of years, or even more, many Zhong Ru Stones have been set into all kinds of different forms. It is a complete work done by nature. Besides, amounts of traces of Liang Shanbo and Zhu Yingtai exist here. Obviously, romantic atmosphere makes this cave more holy. Many people go there just for it with expectation of deep and all-life love, which reflects Chinese traditional culture in love relationship.

Lower cave
It is a broad place with a fall and cliff so that it seems that Lower Cave is connected with the sky. In this cave, many animal statues stand at both sides of the path. Decorated with colourful lights, the statues are so vivid that the whole cave seems like a real nature world.

Water cave
The water cave is a 120- meter long underground brooks river. The depth of water is nearly 4 meters. Decorated with the colourful lights, the cave shows shining of beauty like heaven. What we must pay attention to in it is the way to leave out the cave. Of course, it is not on foot, also not by traffic. It is a hand job. Seated on the boat, people will be brought through the cave by professional workers.

Legend
Many beautiful folk tales flow in world about the discovery of Shanjuan Cave. The most common one is that a great and talented person named Shanjuan in primitive clan society 4 or 5 thousand years ago. Just for his excellent behavior and reputation, emperor Shun at that time wanted to hand over his management right and status as an emperor to him. However, what Shanjuan thought was opposite to what Shun determined. Shanjuan liked a more relaxed way of life and had no interest in political matters. There was no doubt that he refused to Shun's invitation at once with the words 'What I'm dying for is touring around the world, which conflicts with the necessity of an emperor's ability in essence'.

In order to escape it, Shanjuan took a journey to Yixing to start his reclusive life. In memory of this person of virtue, later generations named this cave 'Shanjuan Cave'.

History

References

Caves of Jiangsu
Landforms of Jiangsu
Tourist attractions in Jiangsu
Show caves in China